The International Society for Traumatic Stress Studies is a professional network established on March 2, 1985, in Washington, D.C. It is Seeks disseminate the state of the science as it pertains to the effects of trauma.

History
The organization was originally named the Society for Traumatic Stress Studies when it was established at a meeting organized by Charles Figley and held in Washington, D.C. in March 1985. A foundational objective of the society was to publish a journal featuring scholarly work on traumatic stress. This was achieved in July 1986 with the creation of the Journal of Traumatic Stress, [1] whose first issue was published in January 1988.[2] The Society’s first annual meeting was held in Atlanta, GA in September 1985. In April 1990, the society’s name was changed to the International Society for Traumatic Stress Studies to reflect its growing non-U.S. membership.[3]

The first edition of its newsletter, Stresspoints, [4] which was published in 1986, started with an editorial commenting upon the diversity of opinion expressed in the press about the Space Shuttle Challenger disaster, expressing hope that "very soon we can create a national media registry. This would include those most of us would agree are qualified to comment on the psychosocial consequences of traumatic events . . . We hope that by providing the media with a list of qualified experts, the level of public information about human response to catastrophes will be increased substantially.[5]

Awards 
Each year, the society recognizes the achievements of its members and others dedicated to the field of traumatic stress studies, including students and professionals in research, clinical/patient care settings, media and advocacy. These awards celebrate the efforts of those who work to advance the understanding of trauma and its effects, and honor winners every year at the annual meeting:
Lifetime Achievement Award, given to an individual who has made great lifetime contributions to the field of traumatic stress
Chaim and Bela Danieli Young Professional Award, recognizes excellence in the traumatic stress field by an individual who has completed his or her training within the last five years
Robert S. Laufer, PhD, Memorial Award for Outstanding Scientific Achievement, given to an individual or group who has made an outstanding contribution to research in the field of traumatic stress. 
Sarah Haley Memorial Award for Clinical Excellence, given to a clinician or group of clinicians in direct service to traumatized individuals. 
Public Advocacy Award, given for outstanding and fundamental contributions to advancing social understanding of trauma.
Frank Ochberg Award for Media and Trauma Study,recognizes outstanding contributions by clinicians, researchers, graduate students and scholars working at the intersection of trauma with media and/or journalism.
Frank W. Putnam Trauma Research Scholars, presented to Student Members who submit proposals judged to have the greatest potential to contribute to the field of traumatic stress.
Student Poster Award, presented annually to recognize excellent work in a poster submission to the annual meeting.
Conference on Innovations in Trauma Research Methods, presented for outstanding contribution to trauma research methodology for creating and managing the Conference on Innovations in Trauma Research Methods.

Trauma and journalism
The Dart Center Ochberg Fellowship for journalists who want to deepen their knowledge of emotional trauma and improve the responsible media coverage of violence, conflict and tragedy, was established in 1999 in partnership with Dart Center for Journalism and Trauma.

References

External links
 Official web site

International professional associations
Health care-related professional associations based in the United States
Stress-related disorders